The Return of Swamp Thing is a 1989 American superhero film based on the DC Comics' character of the same name. Directed by Jim Wynorski, it is a sequel to the 1982 film Swamp Thing, having a lighter tone than its predecessor. The film has a main title montage that consists of comic book covers set to Creedence Clearwater Revival's "Born on the Bayou", and features Dick Durock and Louis Jourdan reprising their roles as Swamp Thing and Anton Arcane respectively, along with Sarah Douglas and Heather Locklear.

Plot
After her mother's mysterious death, Abigail Arcane travels to the Florida swamps to confront her evil stepfather Dr. Anton Arcane, who had been resurrected after his death in the first film. In an attempt to stave off the effects of aging, Dr. Arcane, assisted by Dr. Lana Zurrell, combines genes from various swamp animals and human beings, creating an army of monsters known as Un-Men. Dr. Arcane tries to use his stepdaughter Abby in his genetic experiments until she is rescued by Swamp Thing, a scientist previously transformed into a bog creature after a confrontation with the evil doctor.

Cast

 Louis Jourdan as Anton Arcane
 Heather Locklear as Abby Arcane
 Sarah Douglas as Dr. Lana Zurrell
 Dick Durock as Alec Holland / Swamp Thing
 Ace Mask as Dr. Rochelle
 Monique Gabrielle as Miss Poinsettia
 Daniel Emery Taylor as Darryl
 Joey Sagal as Gunn
 RonReaco Lee as Omar
 Frank Welker as the voice of Gigi the Parrot, and creature vocal effects

Production
In a 2018 interview, director Jim Wynorski recalled that he wanted Louis Jourdan to refer to the character of Miss Poinsettia as "Points". Jourdan refused because he knew that the character's nickname was a sexual-innuendo referring to her breasts. Wynorski then asked Jourdan, "Weren't you just in a movie called Octopussy?" Jourdan refused to speak to Wynorski for much of the shoot afterward.

In 2008, Dick Durock said to Bullz-Eye.com that the suit made filming difficult: "I hated the thought of having to go through the whole thing of wearing 50, 60, 70 pounds of weight in the summertime in Savannah, Georgia, but the money was there, and it's a job".

According to BPA, Locklear had a hard time working with the guy who played Swamp Thing in his human form: "The model was full of himself and really rubbed Heather the wrong way. As soon as the model's scene was done, he was asked to leave the set".

Release

Home media
RCA/Columbia Pictures Home Video released the film in 1989 on VHS.

The film was issued on DVD by Image Entertainment, with a commentary by Wynorski which suggests that some of the film's humor was not as intentional as it seems and that Wynorski had a degree of contempt for the material. The DVD also includes two environmental public service announcements for television recorded with Durock in character and the two children featured in the film. The PSAs aired in certain markets in 1989.

Warner Bros. re-released the film in April 2008 on DVD. A Blu-ray edition was released by the British label Screenbound Pictures in May 2017.

MVD Entertainment Group released the film on Blu-ray/DVD combo pack May 8, 2018, as part of their MVD Rewind Collection line. The DVD extras were ported over along with a new commentary track and interviews with Jim Wynorski, composer Chuck Cirino, and editor Leslie Rosenthal, an interview with executive of Lightyear Entertainment Arnie Holland, plus a remastered 2K HD transfer.

An Ultra HD Blu-ray release of the film will be released on February 7, 2023.

Reception

Critical response
, on review aggregation website Rotten Tomatoes, the film had an approval rating of 44% based on 9 reviews, with an average rating of 3.92/10.

Vincent Canby of The New York Times gave a negative review, proclaiming the film "is intended for people who missed the 1982 Swamp Thing and don't want the bother of renting the videocassette". He added that it "means to be funnier than it ever is" and "contains scenes of violence, most of which are so unconvincing as to be less scary than an average comic book".

A writer for Time Out gave a somewhat neutral review, stating "Wynorski is well-versed in double-bluffing his audience, denying them the chance of balking at dreadful special effects by implying that the ineptitude is deliberate. He opts for cheap nostalgic laughs and camp '50s sci-fi scenery; depending on whether you find this funny, you'll either smile knowingly or gasp in disbelief". Another positive review was from Roger Ebert. He gave the movie a "thumbs up" when Gene Siskel did not in the talk show Siskel & Ebert & the Movies. Cinapse also gave the positive review as "The Return Of Swamp Thing is a humorous and oddly sweet action adventure that wants nothing more than to entertain you with its quirkiness from start to finish".

Before his death a year later, Dick Durock stated in a 2008 interview that "they tried in Return of Swamp Thing to make it comedy, campy, and that's tough to make that work. I think [for the TV series] they kind of gave up on that idea and got back to the darker side of the character as he was written in the comic book".

Kathleen Norris published a poem referring to this film ("Return of Swamp Thing") in her book Journey: New and Selected Poems 1969-1999 (2001).

DVD Talk rated the film as 4 stars of 5 stars as "Highly Recommended".

Accolades
Heather Locklear won the Razzie Award for Worst Actress for her performance in the film.

Other media

Novelization
Peter David wrote a novelization of the film. Disappointed with the script, David rewrote large chunks of the story. To his surprise, the producers enjoyed the changes and allowed the book to see print as is.

References

External links
 Official website
 
 
 
 
Return of Swamp Thing at Louisjourdan.net

1989 films
1980s science fiction action films
1980s superhero films
1980s monster movies
1989 horror films
American sequel films
American monster movies
American science fiction action films
1980s science fiction horror films
Films based on DC Comics
Films directed by Jim Wynorski
Swamp Thing in other media
Superhero comedy films
American superhero films
Mad scientist films
American science fiction comedy films
Live-action films based on DC Comics
Films based on works by Len Wein
Superhero horror films
Golden Raspberry Award winning films
1980s English-language films
1980s American films